Monardia multiarticulata is a species of wood midges in the family Cecidomyiidae. It is known from North America and was described by American entomologist Ephraim Porter Felt in 1914.

References

Cecidomyiidae
Articles created by Qbugbot
Insects described in 1914

Taxa named by Ephraim Porter Felt